University of Wasit is one of the Iraqi Universities established in 2003 in Al Kut, Wasit, Iraq.

Establishment
Wasit University was established in January 2003. The university included three colleges belonging to Al Qadisiyah University before establishment. The colleges were: 
 College of Education, founded in 1996,  
 College of Economics and Management founded in 2000 with the departments of Economics and  Department of Management, 
 College of Science, created in 2001 with the departments of Biology Sciences and Physics. 

In 2005 the university expanded to include four new colleges:
 Arts, 
 Medicine, 
 Engineering, 
 Law. 

New departments were:
 Physical Education,
 Oriental Studies at the College of Arts and Chemistry Department, at the College of Science. 
 Public Central Library, 
 Cultural Center for women, 
 Office of Engineering Consultant in the College of Engineering, 
 Centre for Excellence and Creativity.
 
New colleges were:
 College of Education, 
 College of Agriculture.

Colleges

 College of Education, 1996,
 College of Management and Economics, 2000,
 College of Science, 2001,
 College of Fine Arts, 2005, 
 College of Medicine, 2005, 
 College of Engineering, 2005, 
 College of Law, 2005, 
 College of Agriculture,  
College of Basic Education,  
College of Sports Education, 2010,
College of Veterinary Medicine.
College of Dentistry
College of Physical Education and Sports Science
College of Computer and Mathematics
College of Media

References

External links
 

Wasit
Educational institutions established in 2003
2003 establishments in Iraq